California voters passed Proposition 103 on November 8, 1988. It in effect made insurance companies require "prior approval" from the California Department of Insurance before implementing property and casualty insurance rates. It passed with 51% of the vote.

The measure expanded the Department's responsibility for enforcement to include: property insurance, automobile insurance, life insurance and other types of casualty coverage. Proposition 103 made the California Insurance Commissioner an elected position (previously being a governor-appointed position).

The ballot measure required insurers "roll back" their rates 20 percent. Proposition 103 devised a process enabling consumer participation in the setting of insurance rates, and allowed consumer "intervenors" witness fees and expenses in some cases.

Insurance regulation
Insurance types regulated by Proposition 103 are: Personal automobile, dwelling fire, earthquake, homeowners, inland marine, and umbrella; Commercial aircraft, automobile, boiler and machinery, burglary and theft, business owners, earthquake, farm owners, some fidelity, fire, glass, inland marine, medical malpractice, miscellaneous, multi-peril, other liability, professional liability, special multi-peril, umbrella, and coverage under the Longshore and Harbor Workers' Compensation Act.

According to the California Insurance Commissioner, Proposition 103 "has saved consumers billions" since being implemented, specifically a $4.29 billion per year dividend. It also claims "Californians spent 0.3% less on auto insurance in 2010 than they spent in 1989, while the nation spent 43.3% more". The Commissioner quotes a 2013 report of the Consumer Federation that more than $100 billion had been saved by consumers in the 25 years after passage.

Intervenors
Investigatory and regulatory hearings are open to intervenors. Members of the public or organizations can observe or may attend the hearing and request to be heard, submit written comments or present live testimony. Attorney fees can be reimbursed when written comments are submitted that "make a substantial contribution within the time frame in the notice".

Election 
With $207 million spent, the most expensive election campaign in U.S. modern history was the 1988 California insurance initiatives election battle. Only Prop. 103 won voter approval. The $207 million spent, in 2020 dollars adjusted for inflation, which was $95 million in 1988, was reported by the Los Angeles Times. 

Prop. 103, the people's choice, won against the combined $200 million spent against it or trying to pass competing initiatives. Prop. 103 raised $6.4 million in small donations of about $30 from a statewide door-to-door canvass. These small donations from the canvass paid for the modest offices and canvasser salaries, which going into the election reached one million households. TV ads for Prop. 103 were run at no cost by TV stations only due to the fairness doctrine in place at the time, with some equal-time ads. These ads were in response to the tens of millions of dollars being spent by the insurance industry, which also used large direct-mail campaigns, coordinated by consultant Clint Reilly, who acknowledged the efforts against Prop. 103 by insurance companies lacked a lot of public support. With $200 million spent among the other initiatives, both pro and con, however, it came down to the wire, with Prop. 103 winning by only 1%, with a 51% yes vote. The campaign, and its results, received extensive national attention. Court challenges were turned down, and the California Supreme Court upheld every provision of 103.

"Three other insurance measures--Proposition 104, the industry's no-fault proposal, Proposition 100, backed by the state's trial lawyers, and Proposition 101, ... sponsored by dissident insurer Harry Miller,--all were overwhelmingly defeated," reported Kenneth Reich, the L.A. Times staff writer who covered the insurance industry and this election. Reich wrote "But Proposition 103 campaign chairman Harvey Rosenfield suggested that if the insurance industry was in trouble with the public, it had only itself to blame." Proposition 103 was written by Campaign Chairman Harvey Rosenfield, and endorsed by nationally-trusted consumer advocate Ralph Nader, who campaigned repeatedly with Rosenfield for Prop. 103. Staff on the campaign included Bill Zimmerman, noted by PBS for his earlier leading role in opposing the Vietnam War, Carmen Gonzales as Press Spokesperson, Angelo Paparella who directed the massive statewide canvass, Eric Hacopian who continued as a successful California political consultant, and Troy Deckert, who came from the national staff of a presidential campaign, and from years of political experience in Chicago. Deckert added a statewide voter palmcard, which was distributed by the canvassers, and statewide street-level postering, both standard Chicago methods. Patrick Overton (Now Patrick Kadzik), who also worked on a presidential campaign, was the first organizer who proved that the door-to-door canvass could raise small donations in sufficient amounts (about $150 per evening per canvasser) in order to support field modest offices and canvassers. When an election is won by 1%, every effort can accurately have been said to have been critical to victory, from Harvey Rosenfield's legal provisions, to Ralph Nader's endorsement, to the enormous, well-organized door-to-door effort.

References

Insurance law
California law
Propositions